The Losmina is a river in Smolensk Oblast, Russia, a left tributary of the Vazuza.

References

Rivers of Smolensk Oblast